Carrie Schreiner (born 14 September 1998) is a racing driver from Germany, currently competing for ART Grand Prix at the inaugural F1 Academy season.

Biography
Carrie Schreiner began her motorsport career in karting. Between 2011 and 2014 she drove in the ADAC Kart Masters, achieving her greatest success in 2012 when she won the X30 Junior championship title.

She then switched to single-seater racing and competed in ADAC Formula 4 in 2015 and 2016. At the same time, she drove in the British Formula 4 Championship in 2016, where she finished 17th overall.

In 2017, Schreiner moved up to GT cars via the Lamborghini Super Trofeo, competing in several of their championships over the next two years. She finished runner-up in the 2017 Lamborghini Super Trofeo Middle East and a year later won the Pro-Am category in the same series with Konrad Motorsport, having also contested the European Lamborghini Super Trofeo championship with the Austrian squad. At the same time, she competed with the FFF Racing Team in Lamborghini Super Trofeo Asia in 2017.

In the DMV GT & Touring Car Cup she drove an Audi R8 LMS GT3 from 2017 to 2019, first with Aust Motorsport and later from 2018 with Rutronik Racing – winning the championship in 2018. As a result, she stepped up to ADAC GT Masters with the same team – scoring a best championship finish of 24th place in her first season in the series with co-driver Dennis Marschall.

From 2018, Schreiner has been a regular participant in the Nürburgring Endurance Series. After achieving her Class A licence, she became one of the founding drivers of the "Girls Only" program by WS Racing; attempting to encourage more women into the sport. Since 2019, Schreiner has contested four Nürburgring 24 Hours races with the team, winning her class in the 2021 edition. From 2021 she stepped up to the SP9 class for GT3 machinery, competing with Racing One and SchnitzelAlm Racing.

In 2021, Schreiner started in the newly founded BMW M2 Cup - a one-make series on the Deutsche Tourenwagen Masters support bill. Simultaneously she drove in the Italian GT Championship with AF Corse, finishing second at the Vallelunga round with Antonio Fuoco.

She is in a relationship with former DTM driver Peter Terting, some 14 years her senior.

Racing record

Career summary

Complete Nürburgring 24 Hours results

References

External links

Official website
Driver Database profile

1998 births
Living people
German racing drivers
German female racing drivers
Racing drivers from Saarland
F1 Academy drivers
ADAC Formula 4 drivers
ADAC GT Masters drivers
British F4 Championship drivers
24H Series drivers
US Racing drivers
Double R Racing drivers
AF Corse drivers
People from Völklingen
Racing drivers' wives and girlfriends
ART Grand Prix drivers